Adaúfe is a Portuguese freguesia ("civil parish"), located in the municipality of Braga. The population in 2011 was 3,711, in an area of 10.81 km².

References

Freguesias of Braga